is  the Head coach of the Tokyo Hachioji Bee Trains in the Japanese B.League. He played college basketball for Hokkai Gakuen University. He was selected by the Toyama Grouses with the 14th overall pick in the 2006 bj League draft.

Head coaching record

|- 
| style="text-align:left;"|Toyama Grouses
| style="text-align:left;"|2008-09
| 42||8||34|||| style="text-align:center;"|6th in Eastern|||-||-||-||
| style="text-align:center;"|-
|-
| style="text-align:left;"|Shiga Lakestars
| style="text-align:left;"|2010-11
| 34||19||15|||| style="text-align:center;"|Fired|||-||-||-||
| style="text-align:center;"|-
|-
| style="text-align:left;"|Shinshu Brave Warriors
| style="text-align:left;"|2012-13
| 52||17||35|||| style="text-align:center;"|9th in Eastern|||-||-||-||
| style="text-align:center;"|-
|-
| style="text-align:left;"|Saitama Broncos
| style="text-align:left;"|2013-14
| 52||5||47|||| style="text-align:center;"|11th in Eastern|||-||-||-||
| style="text-align:center;"|-
|-
| style="text-align:left;"|Hiroshima Lightning
| style="text-align:left;"|2016
| 2||0||2|||| style="text-align:center;"|-|||-||-||-||
| style="text-align:center;"|-
|-

| style="text-align:left;"|Rizing Fukuoka
| style="text-align:left;"|2016
| 2||0||2|||| style="text-align:center;"|-|||-||-||-||
| style="text-align:center;"|-

|-
| style="text-align:left;"|Tokyo Hachioji Trains
| style="text-align:left;"|2017
| 20||15||5|||| style="text-align:center;"|3rd in B3|||10||5||5||
| style="text-align:center;"|3rd in Final stage
|-
|- style="background:#FDE910;"
| style="text-align:left;"|Tokyo Hachioji Trains
| style="text-align:left;"|2017-18
| 42||34||8|||| style="text-align:center;"|1st in B3|||20||17||3||
| style="text-align:center;"|1st in Final stage
|-
|-

References

1968 births
Living people

Japanese basketball coaches

Saitama Broncos coaches
Shiga Lakes coaches
Shinshu Brave Warriors coaches
Tokyo Hachioji Bee Trains coaches
Toyama Grouses coaches
Toyama Grouses players
Wakayama Trians coaches
Sportspeople from Hokkaido